Benoît Debie (born 1968) is a Belgian cinematographer. He is best known for his work on his frequent collaboration with Gaspar Noe, started in Irréversible (2002). He also works on feature including The Runaways (2010) and Spring Breakers (2012).

Career
Debie attended the Institut des Arts de Diffusion (IAD), a Belgian film school. After graduating, he worked as a camera assistant before taking up cinematography jobs on various television series. He worked in television for ten years while also shooting short films and advertisements. The first feature film he was involved with as a director of photography was Irréversible, a controversial 2002 film directed by Gaspar Noé. Noé contacted him to shoot the film after seeing Debie's previous work, specifically a short film titled A Wonderful Love (1999) directed by Fabrice Du Welz. Debie's next project was Lucile Hadžihalilović's Innocence (2004), followed by The Card Player (2004), an Italian film directed by Dario Argento, and The Ordeal, another collaboration with Fabrice du Welz. In 2006 he photographed the French feature Locked Out.

Debie went on to film Day Night Day Night, Julia Loktev's first film, released in 2006, before returning to work with his previous collaborators: Vinyan (2008) with Fabrice du Welz and Enter the Void (2009) with Gaspar Noé. In 2010 he was cinematographer on The Runaways, a biopic about Joan Jett's first band, and by 2011 he had finished shooting Adrian Grunberg's action film Get the Gringo. The same year, he was named one of Variety magazine's "10 Cinematographers to Watch". He photographed Harmony Korine's Spring Breakers in 2012—which was nominated for an Independent Spirit Award for Best Cinematography—and Wim Wenders' Every Thing Will Be Fine the following year. In 2013 he was hired by American actor Ryan Gosling (whom Debie had first met in 1998) to shoot Gosling's first film, Lost River, which was filmed in 2013 and premiered at the 2014 Cannes Film Festival.

Debie is a member of the Belgian Society of Cinematographers (SBC).

Filmography

Videography
"Who Do We Think We Are", John Legend (2013)
"Bitch Better Have My Money", Rihanna (2015) 
"Apeshit", Beyoncé & Jay-Z (2018)

References

External links
 
 

1968 births
Living people
Belgian cinematographers
Film people from Liège
César Award winners